Hugh Long may refer to:

Hugh Long (politician), Democrat member of the Wisconsin State Assembly in the year 1848
Hugh Long (1923–1988), Scottish footballer